David Pierpont Gardner (born March 24, 1933) was the 15th president of the University of California and was also the president of the University of Utah.

Biography
Gardner was born in Berkeley, California, to Reed S. Gardner and Margaret Pierpont Gardner. He married Elizabeth (Libby) Fuhriman in 1958. They had four daughters (Karen, Shari, Lisa, and Marci) before Libby's death in 1991. He married Sheila S. Rogers in 1995.

Gardner was an active member of the Church of Jesus Christ of Latter-day Saints (LDS Church) and contributed to the Encyclopedia of Mormonism.

Gardner's bachelor's degree in political science, history, and geography was earned at Brigham Young University in 1955. He went on to the University of California, Berkeley, to obtain an MA in political science in 1959 and a PhD in higher education in 1966.

He was appointed as Assistant to the Chancellor at University of California, Santa Barbara, (UCSB) before completing his PhD, and accepted a joint appointment as Assistant Chancellor and Professor of Higher Education at UCSB in 1967. He moved to UCB as the Vice President for Public Service Programs and University Dean of University Extension for UCB in 1971, then became the Vice President for Extended Academic and Public Service Programs in the Office of the President (UC System wide) in 1972.

Gardner left the University of California to become the president of the University of Utah in 1973.

He stayed there until he returned to the University of California in 1983 as President. His wife Libby was named Associate to the President, and he worked with her closely. He resigned after her death in 1991 (effective in 1992), stating that he could not continue without her.   He was given a controversial retirement package worth nearly $2.4 million

In 1983, Gardner was elected a fellow of the National Academy of Public Administration. Gardner was then later elected to the American Academy of Arts and Sciences in 1986 and the American Philosophical Society in 1989. He served as President of the William and Flora Hewlett Foundation from 1993 to 1999. He became a professor of educational leadership and policy in the Graduate School of Education at the University of Utah in 2001. He was also the chair of National Commission on Excellence in Education, whose members wrote the well-known educational document, A Nation at Risk.

References

Further reading

External links
Biography from the University of California archives
Biographical Information
Guide to the David P. Gardner Papers at The Bancroft Library
David P. Gardner website

1933 births
Latter Day Saints from Utah
Brigham Young University alumni
Living people
Presidents of the University of Utah
University of Utah faculty
University of California, Berkeley administrators
University of California, Santa Barbara administrators
University of California, Berkeley alumni
University of California regents
Presidents of the University of California System
People from Berkeley, California
Latter Day Saints from California
Members of the American Philosophical Society